La Mère Catherine is a brasserie in the 18th arrondissement of Paris, France. It is the oldest restaurant located at place du Tertre. It is situated in a building that previously served as the church presbytery of Saint-Pierre de Montmartre.

History
Founded in 1793, it is one of the oldest restaurants in Paris. A plaque at its entrance gives a folk etymology of the word "bistro": that on March 30, 1814, while a group of Russian soldiers were dining at Mère Catherine, they asked for drinks,  (Cyrillic: быстро; Russian: "quickly"). Thereafter, "bistro" became a description of a restaurant where you could get food or drink quickly. In the early twentieth century, the bistro was managed by Mr. Lemoine and owned by Père Labille. During the French Revolution, Georges Danton met his disciples at Mère Catherine. During the Nazi occupation of Paris, 1941-1944, Ernst Jünger was a patron. At one time, guests could enjoy a game of billiards at Mère Catherine; an old postcard depicts billiards players posing in front of the bar. Today, the restaurant is frequented mostly by tourists.

Architecture and fittings
The interior is characterized by dark wood walls, terra cotta tiles, and exposed wooden ceiling beams. It is furnished with large crocks, framed oil paintings of Montmartre landmarks, wooden chairs, and red-and-white checked linens.

References

External links
Official site

Restaurants in Paris
Buildings and structures in the 18th arrondissement of Paris
1793 establishments in France